Liverpool Beatles Museum, formerly known as Magical Beatles Museum, is a museum dedicated to the Beatles located in 23 Mathew Street, Liverpool.

The museum was created by Roag Best, son of Neil Aspinall and Mona Best, half-brother of Pete Best. It was inaugurated on 13 July 2018.

The exposition displays 300 original items, with an addition of 1,200 in storage. It is located in a five-floor building, with three of the floors dedicated to a different period in the Beatles history. The first floor covers 1959–1962, while the second and third cover 1963–1966 and 1967–1970, respectively.

Objects exposed include George Harrison's Futurama guitar, John Lennon's Sergeant Pepper medals, the cello from "I Am the Walrus" and Pete Best's Premier drum. Other items displayed are Paul McCartney's bass speaker, Lennon's custom-made egg chair, police log books listing the names of the officers who guarded the Beatles during their visit of New York City, the "All You Need Is Love" doll from the BBC Our World broadcast, and gifts that Elvis Presley gave to the Beatles.

The building was a former warehouse from early 19th century and is listed as a Grade II by the English Heritage.

See also
The Beatles Story
Cavern Mecca
List of music museums

References

External links

Museums established in 2018
Tourist attractions in Liverpool
Cultural depictions of the Beatles
Music museums in Liverpool
Biographical museums in Merseyside
Rock music museums
2018 establishments in England